Cristian Danci (born 15 July 1988) is a Romanian professional footballer who plays as a midfielder for Voința Lupac.

Honours
Hermannstadt
Cupa României: Runner-up 2017–18

SCM Gloria Buzău
Liga III: 2018–19

References

External links
 
 
 Cristian Danci at Footballdatabase

1988 births
Living people
Sportspeople from Reșița
Romanian footballers
Association football midfielders
Liga I players
Liga II players
Liga III players
CF Liberty Oradea players
FC Bihor Oradea players
CS Sportul Snagov players
FC Botoșani players
CS Șoimii Pâncota players
CS Gaz Metan Mediaș players
FC Hermannstadt players
FC Petrolul Ploiești players
FC Gloria Buzău players
CSM Reșița players